Lokko is a Ghanaian surname. Notable people with this surname include:

 Eva Lokko (died 2016), Ghanaian engineer and politician
 Kevin Lokko (born 1995), English football player
 Lesley Lokko, Ghanaian-Scottish architect, academic, and novelist
 Mary Lokko, Ghanaian activist
Vivian Kai Lokko, Ghanaian Journalist